Toomata Alapati Poese (~1950 - 20 April 2014) was a Samoan politician and Cabinet Minister. He was a member of the Human Rights Protection Party.

Toomata was educated at the University of Hawaiʻi and worked as a lecturer at the School of Agriculture at the University of the South Pacific. He was first elected to the legislative Assembly of Samoa in a by-election in 1999. He was re-elected in the 2001 election and in 2005 was appointed Minister of Agriculture and Fisheries.

He was re-elected at the 2006 election and appointed Minister of Education. In November 2009 he broke a leg in a car accident. He subsequently pleaded guilty to two charges of careless driving, and was fined US$150.

He lost his seat in the 2011 election.

References

2014 deaths
Members of the Legislative Assembly of Samoa
Human Rights Protection Party politicians
Government ministers of Samoa
Education ministers of Samoa
University of Hawaiʻi at Mānoa alumni
Year of birth uncertain